John Hatch may refer to:
John Hatch (development specialist), American economic development expert
John Hatch (basketball, born 1947), Mexican basketball player
John Hatch (basketball, born 1962), Canadian basketball player
John Porter Hatch (1822–1901), American Civil War general
John Hatch, Baron Hatch of Lusby, British author, broadcaster, lecturer and politician